Below is a list of primary schools and secondary schools in the Asian country of Kuwait.  Tertiary schools are listed at the list of universities in Kuwait.

Most schools in Kuwait are public schools which educate in the Arabic language. There are, however, a few schools which run under Indian Central Board of Secondary Education, British, American and French systems, or a combination of languages.

American Schools 
 American School of Ahmadi – 
 American Creativity Academy
 American International School of Gulf
 American International School of Kuwait
 American School of Kuwait
 American United School of Kuwait – 
 Kuwait American School – 
 Martyr Asrar AlQabandi Bilingual School - (M.A.Q.B.S)
 Universal American School – 
Aspire Bilingual School - https://www.absk.edu.kw/

Bangladeshi schools 

 Morning Glory Bangladesh International School (Abdullah Al Mubarak Area)

Bilingual schools 

 Ajial Bilingual School
 Al-Bayan Bilingual School –  
 Al-Ghanim Bilingual School –  
 Al-Ma'alee Bilingual School
 Al-Nibras International Bilingual School
 Al-Noor Bilingual School – 
 Aspire Bilingual School 
 Al-Ru'ya Bilingual School
 Alzabne School
 American Arab Bilingual Academy
 American Bilingual School
 Canadian Bilingual School – 
 Danah Universal School of Kuwait -  
 Dasman Bilingual School - 
 Future Bilingual School - http://fbs.edu.kw/
 Global Bilingual Academy – 
 Jahra Bilingual Academy
 Hayat Universal Bilingual School
 Kuwait Academy Bilingual School –  
 Kuwait Bilingual School – Al Jahra
 Orbit International 
 The Rainbow Playgroup
 Rawd Alsalheen Bilingual School – 
 Northwest Bilingual School

British schools
 Al Quabandhi Bilingual School
 British School of Kuwait
 Cambridge English School
 Cascade British Nursery School –  
 English School Fahaheel Kuwait
 English School for Girls – Salwa – 
 Falcon English School – 
 Gulf British Academy – 
 Gulf English School of Kuwait – 
 International Academy of Kuwait – 
 International British School of Kuwait - 
 Kuwait English School
 Kuwait International English School – 
 Kuwait National English School – 
 New English School
 Oxford Academy of Kuwait – 
 Pakistan English School - PES 
 Tahreer English School
 The English Academy – 
 The English School, Kuwait
 The English Playgroup and Primary School – 

 Gulf British Academy

Egyptian schools 

 Kuwait Egyptian Embassy School – Jabriya

French school 

 Lycée Français de Koweït

Indian schools 

 , Mahboula
 Jabriya Indian School – Jabriya 
 Al Amal Indian School – Salmiya 
 Al Rashid Indian School – Farwaniya
 Carmel School – Khaitan
 Fahaheel Al-Watanieh Indian Private School (DPS) – Al Ahmadi
 Gulf Indian School – Mangaf
 
 Indian Learners Own Academy
 Indian Community School, Amman branch – Salmiya, Block 12 
 Indian Community School, Junior branch – Salmiya, Block 10
 Indian Community School, Khaitan branch – Khaitan
 Indian Community School, Senior branch – Salmiya, Block 10
 Indian Educational School (Bharatiya Vidya Bhavan) – Jleeb Al-Shuyoukh
 Indian English Academy School (Don Bosco) – Salmiya, Block 10
 
 Indian Public School – Salmiya, Block 12
 Integrated Indian School – Jleeb Al-Shuyoukh, Block 25
  
 Kuwait Indian School – Jleeb Al-Shuyoukh
 
 United Indian School – Jleeb Al-Shuyoukh
 United International Indian School - Hasawi
 New Indian Central School - Mangaf
 Indian Central School - Jleeb Al-Shuyoukh
 Global English School - Fahaheel
 Smart Indian School, Kuwait
 , Jleeb Al-Shuyoukh

Iranian schools 

 Iranian School of Kuwait

Pakistani schools 

 Fahaheel Pakistan School
 Gulf Pakistan English School and College
 International School & College of Pakistan
 Kuwait Pakistan English School
 New Pakistan International School – Hawalli
 Oxford Pakistani English School
 Pakistan Academy School – Al Ahmadi(English medium school) 
 Pakistan English Academy – Al Farwaniyah
 Pakistan English School  – Jleeb Al-Shuyoukh
 Pakistan Excel English School - https://www.peskuwait.com – Jleeb Al-Shuyoukh
 Pakistan School, Rumaithya
 Pakistan National English School
 Pakistan School – Mangaf
 Pakistan Sunshine School – Hawalli

Private schools 

 Al-Jamil Private School – Salmiya
 The Arab Modern Academy – Salmiya
 Al Manhal Private School – Salmia
 Al-Wataniya Private School – Hawally
 Pakistan English Academy – Farwaniya
 Al Shahin School – Medan Hawally
 Al Najat School – Al Najah
 Pakistan Academy School – Al Ahmadi
 AlQutoof Private School
 Al Qabas School – Hawally

UAS Kuwait

Public schools

Elementary schools

Boys 

 Abdulrahman al-Ghafiqi – Rumaithiya
 Amir bin Umar
 As-shuhada' – Rumaithiya
 Khabbab ibn al-Arat – Jabriya
 Muhammad as-Shaiji – Rumaithiya
 Qis bin Abi As
 Seef ad-Dawla

Girls 

 ar-Ridifa
 Arwa bint al-Harith – Rumaithiya
 Fatima bint al-Yamaan
 Maysaloun
 Um Ataya – Abdullah Al-Salem
 Umm al-Qura – Rumaithiya

Middle schools

Boys 

 Abu Tammam – Rumaithiya
 Muhammad Abdullah al-Wheib – Jabriya
 Muhammad Hasan al-Musawi – Rumaithiya

Girls 

 al-Qairawan – Rumaithiya
 Umm Salama – Rumaithiya

Secondary schools

Boys 

 Fahd ad-Duwairy – Jabriya
 Jabir al-Ahmad – Jabriya
 Palestine – Rumaithiya
 Essa Abdullah Al-Houli - Eqaila
 Hamad Al-Rujaib - Kaifan

Girls 

 25 February – Rumaithiya
 aj-Jeel aj-Jadeed (American Academy for girls)
 Qurtuba
 Umama bint Bishr – Rumaithiya

Special-needs schools 

 Al-Huda School for Special Needs
 Al Khalifa School for Special Needs
 Al-Nibras School for Special Needs
 Al-Sabah Ideal Nursery for Disabled
 Conductive Education School, Kuwait
 Creative Children International School, Kuwait – 
 Ideal Education School 
 Manarat School for Special Needs
 Sultan International Academy – West Mishref

See also

 Education in Kuwait
 Lists of schools

External links 
 https://archive.today/20110811015647/http://abbassiya.net/category/5/
https://www.indiansinkuwait.com/news/Aspire-Indian-International-School-to-start-this-academic-year-2020-2021/
https://www.indiansinkuwait.com/news/DAS-Academy-launched-for-dance-arts-and-sports-activities-for-kids
https://www.indiansinkuwait.com/news/61390-Indian-Central-School-Pinks-it-with-Aspire-Indian-International-Aspire-Bilingual-School-and-Pakistan-English-School/

Schools
Schools
Schools
Kuwait
Kuwait